The Autobianchi Primula is a supermini economy car manufactured between 1964 and 1970 by the Italian automaker Autobianchi, partly owned by and later a subsidiary of the Fiat Group. The Primula was a prototype for Fiat's rack and pinion steering and is widely known for its innovative Dante Giacosa-designed front-wheel drive, transverse engine layout — that would be later popularized by the Fiat 128 to ultimately become an industry-standard front drive layout.

The Primula was originally available with two or four doors, with or without a rear hatchback, referred to in Italian as "berlina".  Beginning in 1965, Autobianchi offered a coupé model, a more  spacious 2-door fastback designed by Carrozzeria Touring.

The Primula was manufactured in the Autobianchi factory in Desio, with production reaching approximately 75,000 before ending in 1970.

Concept 
Prior to the Primula, all Fiat Group passenger cars were rear-wheel drive; the larger models followed the classic FR layout (front engine powering the rear axle), and small cars were rear-engined. Meanwhile, a practical concept emerged, namely the front-wheel drive layout with the engine mounted transversely, which allowed for very efficient space utilization. This arrangement had been popularised by the British Motor Corporation's Mini, launched in 1959. That car had its transmission integrated into the engine's oil sump, producing a very compact drivetrain for use on a small car. However the Mini had significant transmission problems early in its production run and the arrangement had poor refinement, high noise levels and was awkward to service. The early issues were resolved and the concept spread to larger BMC products, notably the 1100/1300 series built in Italy by Innocenti. These larger models did not require the transmission-in-sump arrangement for the purposes of space utilization (as on the Mini) but retained it for design and parts commonality. 

Fiat's chief designer, Dante Giacosa, recognized the potential of the concept and sought ways to improve on it - namely by removing the transmission from the sump. This would produce a larger overall powertrain unit but this was not essential in the type of cars Giacosa proposed. In return such cars would be easier to service and repair and benefit from greater refinement and lower noise levels. Fiat was cautiously accepting of Giacosa's proposal and decided to experiment without risking damage to the image of its popular Fiat-branded cars. Thus the Autobianchi Primula emerged—a car marketed under a less crucial nameplate, for which it was an entry into a whole new class of vehicles. The key to Giacosa's design was a compact concentric clutch release mechanism using a hydraulic piston mounted inside a hollow gearbox input shaft, thus doing away with the traditional external clutch lever and release arm and the internal clutch thrust bearing. This allowed the powertrain to be short enough to fit across the Primula's engine bay while allowing for the required steering angles and the determined overall width. With the transmission mounted end-on to the engine and the final drive therefore offset from the car's centre line, the Primula had unequal-length driveshafts.

Driveline 
Initially, the Primula was fitted with the 1221 cc engine from the Fiat 1100 D (for the coupé it was uprated to ), but in 1968 it was replaced with Fiat 124 engines—the berlinas received the 1197 cc  engine from the standard versions, while the coupé was fitted with the more powerful 1438 cc  unit. All engines used in the Primula had overhead valves (OHV)—the later twin cam derivative of the 1438 cc unit was not used in any Autobianchi (Fiat did use it later in the Lancia Beta- the issue at the time in a transverse installation of a twin-cam head being the arrangement of the exhaust manifold of the necessarily cross-flow head). Unlike  contemporaneous BMC and Peugeot models, which had the transmission in the oil sump, the Primula had its manual transmission placed end-on, above the differential. The Primula also featured disc brakes on all four wheels, uncommon in small cars of the time.

The Primula's particular configuration of front wheel drive and transverse engine, but with a gearbox on the end of the engine, ingenious Fiat-designed clutch release mechanism and unequal length drive shafts, rather than a gearbox in the sump like the Mini, has become universal among front-wheel-drive cars. The suspension used a single wishbone and upper transverse leaf spring at the front (which eliminated an upper suspension arm pivot and thus allowed space for the gearbox), with a "dead" axle at the rear. The Primula is thus a car design of far greater significance than is often realised, as its design influence spread, far beyond even the mainstream high volume Fiats such as the 128 and the 127 of the late 1960s which used its driveline layout combined with MacPherson struts (which also allowed space for the gearbox); to every front wheel drive transverse engined car in production today.

Reception 
The Primula was favorably received in the marketplace and came second in the 1965 European Car of the Year awards, after another front-wheel drive car, the Austin 1800.  This convinced Fiat to develop the drive concept further. In 1969 the first Fiat with a front-mounted transverse engine, the Fiat 128, was launched, along with two new front-wheel drive Autobianchis: the Autobianchi A112, smaller than the Primula, and the larger Autobianchi A111. The 128 secured Fiat the Car of the Year title in 1970, with A112 coming second.

References

External links
 Contemporary Italian Autobianchi Primula brochures (Berlina and Coupé) at the Registro Autobianchi site 
 1965 Dutch Autobianchi Primula brochure

Primula
Front-wheel-drive vehicles
Cars introduced in 1964